van Riemsdijk is a surname, literally "of belt dike". Notable people with the surname include:

Herman Claudius van Riemsdijk (born 1948), Brazilian chess player
Jeremias van Riemsdijk (1712–1777), Dutch noble and Governor-General of the Dutch East Indies
John Van Riemsdijk (1924-2008), an Anglo-Dutch curator of the Science Museum, London and model engineer.
Henk van Riemsdijk (1911-2005), Dutch CEO of Philips.

Surnames of Dutch origin